Sister Louisa's Church of the Living Room and Ping Pong Emporium, or simply Church, is a bar on Edgewood Avenue in the Old Fourth Ward of Atlanta, Georgia, in the United States. It is owned by Grant Henry, an American former divinity student, artist and businessman best known for his artwork and installations created under the auspice of his alter ego "Sister Louisa".

History
In 2001, Henry opened an Atlanta gallery on St. Charles Ave. in Atlanta called Sister Louisa's Church of the Living Room; Come on in, Precious. The gallery closed after six months. At the time, Henry was bartending at a bar called The Local. He was voted "Best Bartender" in the city for 2006 and 2007 by the readership of Atlanta's alternative publication, Creative Loafing.

In 2010, Henry opened Church. The New York Times described the bar by writing, "Opened in December 2010 by Grant Henry, a former divinity school student, this bar plays with, and spoofs, church culture. Karaoke is performed in choir robes, and walls are decorated with faux-religious pop art."

References

External links
Official website

Drinking establishments in Georgia (U.S. state)
Old Fourth Ward
Restaurants established in 2010
2010 establishments in Georgia (U.S. state)